SOA may refer to:

Arts, entertainment, and media
 Siege of Avalon, a 2000 computer role-playing game
 Soldiers of Anarchy, a 2002 real-time tactics computer game
 Sons of Anarchy, an FX television series named after the fictitious outlaw motorcycle club it portrays
 Sons of Azrael, a deathcore band from Buffalo, New York
 State of Alert, a hardcore punk group formed in Washington, D.C.

Computing and technology
 Safe operating area, the recommended voltage and current conditions for a semiconductor
 Semiconductor optical amplifier
 Service-oriented architecture, a set of software design principles and methodologies
 SOA governance, a concept for services control in such an architecture
 SOA security
 Start of Authority record, a type of resource record in the Domain Name System (DNS)
 Statement of Applicability (SoA), an ISO/IEC 27001 document for information security management systems 
 Structure of arrays, a method of arranging records in memory

Enterprises and organizations
 School of the Americas, now the Western Hemisphere Institute for Security Cooperation, a U.S. Department of Defense training facility
 Siksha 'O' Anusandhan (SOA University), Bhubaneswar, Odisha, India
 Security and Intelligence Agency, (Croatian: Sigurnosno-obavještajna agencija or SOA), in Croatia
 Scottish Orienteering Association, in Scotland

 Society of Actuaries, in North America
 Society of Ancients, a UK-based non-profit organization to promote ancient and medieval history and war gaming
 Special Operations Australia, a.k.a. Services Reconnaissance Department, a World War II agency
 State Oceanic Administration, a Chinese administrative agency
 Swiss Olympic Association, the National Olympic Committee representing Switzerland.

Sports
 SOA (basketball club), an Ivorian basketball club based in Yamoussoukro
 SOA (football club), an Ivorian basketball club based in Yamoussoukro

Other uses
 Secondary organic aerosol, a type of particulate matter produced by combustion engines
 Southampton Airport Parkway railway station, located in Eastleigh in the county of Hampshire, England
 Stimulus onset asynchrony, a measure used in experimental psychology
 Super output areas, geographical regions defined in the U.K.'s ONS coding system
 Statement of account

See also

 Soa (disambiguation)
 School of the Arts (disambiguation)
 SOAS (disambiguation)